I Like to Play Games is a 1995 American softcore erotic drama film that was directed by Moctezuma Lobato and written by David Keith Miller. It stars Lisa Boyle and Ken Steadman, with Jennifer Burton, Monique Noel, and Cheryl Rixon also featured in the cast. It was released on September 15, 1995, and was followed in 1999 by I Like to Play Games Too.

Plot
Michael (Ken Steadman) is looking for a woman who likes to play games, but when he finds Suzanne (Lisa Boyle), he discovers that she may be more than he bargained for. Once Michael meets Suzanne, they strike up a relationship, which proves to be intense. Their first date takes them first to a restaurant, then into an alley where they fool around for a bit. They go back to his place to fool around some more. She then leaves. The next day, both attend a business meeting, during which Suzanne plays footsie with Michael. They return to his residence to fool around in his bathtub, then move onto his bed to fool around some more. But Suzanne flees and boards a taxi. This causes Michael, still naked under a bathrobe, to run after the cab taking Suzanne away. Arrested for indecent exposure, Michael places two telephone calls seeking release on bail. The first, to Suzanne, is without success. The second, to Nick (James DiZazzo), one of his friends, yields results. Suzanne then lures Michael to a motel bed and leaves him cuffed there to the bed naked while she leaves to go back to work to attend a meeting. She returns to him and they have sex on the motel bed.

Cast

 Lisa Boyle as Suzanne
 Ken Steadman as Michael
 Jennifer Burton as Tiffany
 Monique Noel as Valerie
 Cheryl Rixon as Sean
 James DiZazzo as Nick
 Pamela Dickerson as Melody
 Toshiya Agata as Kobe
 Tom Druzbick as Lochran
 Brittney Kwon as Asian Girl
 Cappuccino Moore as Jack
 Kenneth Roussell as Alexei

Releases
The film had international video and television releases: Brazilian Portuguese as O Jogo do Sexo (TV), and as Seduzidos Pelo Jogo (video); Canadian (French title) Suzanne; Germany as Opfer der Lust (video) and as Verhängnisvolle Täuschung (TV); Spain as Una chica muy traviesa; In Finland as Esileikit and as Villit leikit; In the United Kingdom as I Like to Play Games; Italy as Mi piace giocare (TV) and Venezuela as Me gusta jugar.

References

External links
 I Like to Play Games at the Internet Movie Database

1995 films
American erotic drama films
1990s erotic drama films
1995 drama films
1990s English-language films
1990s American films